Cyclidia sericea is a moth in the family Drepanidae. It was described by Warren in 1922. It is found on Borneo.

The ground colour of the wings is white with brownish-grey markings. These are evenly distributed, macular and darker at the wing margins.

References

Moths described in 1922
Cyclidiinae